The 1903 New York state election was held on November 3, 1903, to elect a judge of the New York Court of Appeals, as well as all members of the New York State Assembly and one member of the New York State Senate.

Background
Denis O'Brien had been elected to the Court of Appeals in 1889, and his term would expire at the end of 1903.

State Senator Charles P. McClelland was appointed U.S. General Appraiser by President Theodore Roosevelt and thus vacated his seat.

Candidates
The Democratic State Committee met on September 5 in Albany, New York. Frank Campbell was Chairman. The incumbent judge Denis O'Brien was re-nominated unanimously.

The Republican State Committee met on September 8 at the Fifth Avenue Hotel. George W. Dunn was Chairman. They endorsed the Democratic incumbent Denis O'Brien.

Result
The jointly nominated incumbent Denis O'Brien was re-elected.

96 Republicans, 53 Democrats and 1 Independent were elected for the session of 1904 to the Assembly.

Republican Francis M. Carpenter was elected to succeed Democrat McClelland in the State Senate, giving the Republicans a majority of 29 to 21 in 1904.

See also
 New York state elections

Notes

Sources
Result in New York County: OFFICIAL ELECTION TOTALS in NYT on December 2, 1903
COUNT ON LEGISLATURE in NYT on November 5, 1903
Result: The Tribune Almanac 1904

1903
1903 New York (state) elections